The Naval Mine 2000 is an advanced naval mine developed by Patria for the Finnish Navy. It has stealth and advanced target-recognition capabilities and it is also being marketed elsewhere.

The mine detects the physical impulses of approaching vessels and can choose which ones are the most valuable ones. The Naval Mine 2000 project began in 1997 and the manufacturing was initiated in 2004. Deliveries for the Finnish Navy continued until 2008.

External links
 Finnish Navy announcement 9 December 2004
 Sea Mine 2000
 Forcit Defence
 

Finnish Navy
Naval mines